The South Korea women's national football team (recognised as Korea Republic by FIFA) represents South Korea in international women's football competitions. The South Korean women's team has qualified for three FIFA World Cups in 2003, 2015 (when they reached the round of 16) and 2019.

History

1949–2002: The beginning
Less than a year after the government of the Republic of Korea was established in 1948, the first official women's football matches were held in Seoul on 28 and 29 June 1949, as a part of the National Girls' and Women's Sport Games. While women's basketball and volleyball won public recognition through the Games, football was seen as being unsuitable for women and unattractive to the public. As a result, the women's teams were disbanded soon after the event.

When women's football was officially adopted at the 1990 Asian Games in Beijing, the South Korean sports authorities decided to form a women's team with athletes from other sports and send the team to the Games. The result was defeat in all matches against Japan, North Korea, China and Chinese Taipei. Nevertheless, colleges and corporations started to launch women's football teams through the 1990s and the first annual national women's football event, the Queen's Cup, was held in 1993. With these changes, South Korea was able to finish in fourth place at the 1995 AFC Women's Championship in Malaysia.

When the 1999 Women's World Cup sparked interest worldwide, the South Korean ministry in charge of sports sponsored the foundation of new teams and tournaments for girls’ high school teams, university teams and company teams. To promote women's football, the Korea Women's Football Federation (KWFF) was established in March 2001, as an independent organization in association with the Korea Football Association (KFA).

2003–2013: First World Cup and a period of decline
South Korea finished in third place at the 2003 AFC Women's Championship and qualified for the World Cup for the first time. The Taegeuk Ladies were drawn in Group B with Norway, France and Brazil. Their first match played at the World Cup was a 3–0 loss to Brazil on 21 September 2003. They went on to lose 1–0 to France and 7–1 to Norway. Kim Jin-hee scored the first ever South Korean World Cup goal on 27 September 2003 against Norway.

Despite winning the inaugural EAFF E-1 Football Championship on home soil in 2005, South Korea failed to qualify for the 2007 FIFA Women's World Cup. The Taegeuk Ladies won bronze at the 2010 Asian Games and at the 2010 EAFF Women's Football Championship, but once again failed to qualify for the 2011 FIFA Women's World Cup.

2014–present: Second World Cup and rise
South Korea finished in fourth place at the 2014 AFC Women's Asian Cup and qualified for the 2015 FIFA Women's World Cup, where they made it out of the group stage for the first time. They were drawn in Group E with Brazil, Spain and Costa Rica. South Korea lost 2–0 to Brazil on 9 June 2015, but a 2–2 draw with Costa Rica on 13 June and a 2–1 victory against Spain on 17 June were enough to progress for the first time ever at a World Cup. They went on to lose 3–0 to France in the round of 16 on 21 June 2015.

2019 World Cup: Third World Cup
Coming off an improved showing at the previous one, South Korea qualified for the 2019 FIFA Women's World Cup and were put in Group A with France, Norway and Nigeria. However, they could not repeat their prior success in 2015 and lost all three games and exited the tournament in the group stage, only scoring one goal in their entire run and even an own goal.

Team image

Nicknames
The South Korea women's national football team has been known or nicknamed as the "Taegeuk Ladies".

Kits and crest
The women's team usually use exactly the same kit as its male counterpart, along with the combinations available.
However, there were many combinations that the men's team never used.

Rivalries

Japan

South Korea has a long-standing rivalry with Japan, though in contrast to the fairly dominant performance of the men's team, South Korea women's team has lost more than won against Japan. The two sides met for the first time in 1990, as South Korea suffered a 1–13 defeat to the hand of Japan. As of 2022, South Korea trailed behind with just 4 wins, 11 draws and 18 losses. There have been some reasons for South Korea's weaker performance against Japan: South Korea, unlike Japan, has developed women's football much later than Japan, and also, unlike Japan, South Korea does not have a professional women's league, with the highest domestic league of South Korea, the WK League, is only operated in part-time status, while Japan has already established a professional league, the WE League, in 2020.

Overseas Players
Since 2014 the best Korean players have begun to look to play overseas, most notably in England. There are currently three Korean Women playing in the FAWSL: Cho So-hyun of Tottenham Hotspur, Lee Geum-min of Brighton & Hove Albion and Park Ye-eun also of Brighton & Hove Albion.

FIFA World Ranking
, after the match against .

 Best Ranking   Best Mover   Worst Ranking   Worst Mover

Results and fixtures

The following is a list of match results in the last 12 months, as well as any future matches that have been scheduled.

Legend

2022

2023

Official Match Fixtures – KFA.or.kr
Official Match Results – KFA.or.kr
Fixtures and Results (South Korea) – Soccerway.com

All-time results
 The following table shows South Korea women's all-time international record, correct as of 1 Jan 2021.

 Source: Worldfootball.net

Coaching staff

Current coaching staff

Manager history

, after the match against .

Players

Current squad
The following 26 players were called up for the 2023 Arnold Clark Cup.

Caps and goals correct as of 22 February 2023 against .

Recent call-ups
The following players have been called up to the South Korea squad in the past 12 months.

INJ

INJ
INJ
INJ

INJ
INJ

Previous squads

 FIFA Women's World Cup
 2003 FIFA Women's World Cup squad
 2015 FIFA Women's World Cup squad
 2019 FIFA Women's World Cup squad

 AFC Women's Asian Cup
 2010 AFC Women's Asian Cup squad
 2014 AFC Women's Asian Cup squad
 2018 AFC Women's Asian Cup squad
 2022 AFC Women's Asian Cup squad

Records

*Active players in bold, statistics as of 9 February 2020.

Most capped players

Top goalscorers

Honours

Continental
 AFC Women's Asian Cup
  Runners-up: 2022

Regional
 EAFF E-1 Football Championship
  Champions: 2005
  Runners-up: 2015, 2019

 Cyprus Women's Cup
  Runners-up: 2017

Competitive record
 Champions   Runners-up   Third place   Fourth place

FIFA Women's World Cup

*Draws include knockout matches decided on penalty kicks.

Olympic Games

AFC Women's Asian Cup

Asian Games

EAFF E-1 Football Championship

Other tournaments

See also

 Sport in South Korea
 Football in South Korea
 Women's football in South Korea
 Korea Football Association (KFA)
 National teams
Men's
 National football team
 National under-23 football team
 National under-20 football team
 National under-17 football team
 National futsal team
 National beach soccer team
 Women's
 National under-20 football team
 National under-17 football team
 National futsal team

References

External links

 Official website on KFA.or.kr 
 South Korea profile on FIFA.com

 
Korea Republic